The 2010 Seguros Bolívar Open Pereira was a professional tennis tournament played on hard courts. It was part of the 2010 ATP Challenger Tour. It took place in Pereira, Colombia between 12 and 18 April 2010.

ATP entrants

Seeds

Rankings are as of April 5, 2010.

Other entrants
The following players received wildcards into the singles main draw:
  Carlton Fiorentino
  Gastón Gaudio
  Emilio Gómez
  Eduardo Struvay

The following players received entry from the qualifying draw:
  Facundo Bagnis
  Iván Endara
  Juan Sebastián Gómez
  Michael Quintero

The following players received special exempt into the singles main draw:
  Juan Sebastián Cabal

Champions

Singles

 Santiago Giraldo def.  Paolo Lorenzi, 6–3, 6–3

Doubles

 Dominik Meffert /  Philipp Oswald def.  Gero Kretschmer /  Alex Satschko, 6–7(4), 7–6(6), [10–5]

References
2010 Draws
Official website of Seguros Bolívar Tennis
ITF search 

Seguros Bolivar Open Pereira
Tennis tournaments in Colombia
Seguros Bolívar Open Pereira
2010 in Colombian tennis